The Pop Factory (TPF) is a music and media complex in Porth, Rhondda, South Wales, which gave its name to a pop music TV show of the early 2000s.

The music venue was founded by Emyr Afan and his wife Mair Afan.

The Pop Factory was a converted soft drinks factory, formerly belonging to the "Welsh Hills" brand (which later became "Corona"). The pop factory was situated in the Thomas and Evans building. Thomas and Evans, were both buried in the Rhondda, also owned Bronwydd House and Porth Park.  It was officially opened by Tom Jones in 2000, by smashing a bottle of dandelion and burdock against its walls.

The weekly shows were first broadcast by BBC1 Wales before being picked up by HTV/ITV Wales. The show was presented by Steve Jones and Liz Fuller, with Welsh bands like Feeder, Stereophonics, Lostprophets, Kosheen and The Kennedy Soundtrack appearing. More mainstream pop acts like Sophie Ellis-Bextor, Mis-teeq and S Club 7 also appeared. There was also a Welsh language show, Sesiwn Hwyr, broadcast by S4C. In 2008 the show disappeared with no official reason given and no new series have been screened, though performances from the early BBC shows have been used in BBC Four music compilations such as St David's Day at the BBC.

The Pop Factory was also the studio home of local musical entrepreneur Rob Reed of Magenta fame.

In 2011 the site was bought by Valleys Kids and is used as an office, hub and live venue.

Pop Factory Awards
Every year, TPF hosted an award ceremony, which in 2005 was focused mainly on the Welsh music scene, possibly due to the axing of The Welsh Music Awards. This did not happen in its entirety in 2006 but went back to its full Welsh format in 2007. The 2007 event was also launched in conjunction with XFM Wales.

Previous winners

2007
Best live act: Funeral for a Friend
Best live event: The Full Ponty
Rock 'n' roll excess award: Dirty Sanchez
Best new act: Kids in Glass Houses
Best album: Stereophonics: Pull the Pin
Best Welsh band: Manic Street Preachers
Best international artist/Export: The Automatic
Contribution to the music industry: Martin Hall
Outstanding contribution to music: Mike Peters
Best performance on The Guest List: The Enemy
Best Welsh language act: Sibrydion, Genod Droog
Xfm Artist of the Year: The Wombats

2006
Best live act: Lostprophets
Best live event: Green Man Festival
Rock 'n' roll excess award: The Automatic
Best new act: The Blackout
Best album: Lostprophets: Liberation Transmission
Best Welsh band: Lostprophets
Best international artist: Katherine Jenkins
Contribution to the music industry: Marcus Russell
Outstanding contribution to music: Lemmy
Best performance on The Guest List: The Automatic
Best Welsh language act: Frizbee
Red Dragon artist of the year: The Feeling
Community music award: Winner: Community Music Wales

2005
Best Pop act: Liberty X
Best Album: Feeder: Pushing The Senses
Best Live act: Stereophonics
Best Welsh band: Lostprophets
Best Welsh language act: The Poppies
Best Welsh export: Jem
Best new act: The Automatic
Best live event: Wakestock
Best Performance on the Guest List: Bullet for My Valentine
Outstanding contribution to music: Tom Jones
Contribution to the music industry: Dai Davies
Community music award: SONIG
Rock and roll excess award: Goldie Lookin' Chain

2004
Best Pop act: Estelle
Best Album: Goldie Lookin' Chain: Greatest Hits
Best Live act: Embrace
Best Welsh band: Lostprophets
Best new act: Along Came Man
Outstanding contribution to music: Pino Paladino
Contribution to the music industry: Greg Haver
Community music award: Immtech
Rock and roll excess award: Stuart Cable

2003
Best Pop act: Blazin' Squad
Best Album: Permission to Land by The Darkness
Best Pop Factory Performance: The Darkness
Best Live act: Super Furry Animals
Best Pop Factory Debut: Funeral for a Friend
Best New Talent: The Crimea
Best Welsh Language Talent: Texas Radio Band
Best Welsh Language New Talent: Jakokoyak

References

Recording studios in Wales
ITV (TV network) original programming
Welsh music awards